Maïmouna Gueye Fall, is a Franco–Sénégalese actress. She is best known for her roles in the films  The Climb, Payoff, Cuties, Bacon on the Side.

Personal life
After the marriage with a French man, she went France in 1998. However, after few months, she divorced after facing racism and stereotypes from the husband. After the divorce, she moved to Paris.

Career
Gueye started acting career with the stage play in an adaptation of Sophocles Antigone under the supervision of Haitian writer, Gérard Chenet. In 2004, she acted in another stage play, the French adaptation of the famous Monologues du vagin by Eve Ensler. Later she moved to theater production and made the popular plays, Souvenirs de la dame en noir and She is black, but she is beautiful.

After many theater plays, she finally appeared in cinema with her debut role in the film Payoff in 2003. Later she made the lead role in the film Touristes? Oh yes! directed by Jean-Pierre Mocky in 2004. 

She is the founder of 'Afrokids', a children's recreation club that provides painting, reading, dancing, storytelling, and DIY workshops.

Filmography

References

External links
 

Living people
Senegalese film actresses
Year of birth missing (living people)
French theatre directors
French film actresses